The Hohgwächte is a mountain of the Pennine Alps, situated near Randa in Valais. It belong to the Mischabel massif and is located west of the Dom and the Festijoch

References

External links
 Hohgwächte on Hikr

Mountains of the Alps
Alpine three-thousanders
Mountains of Switzerland
Mountains of Valais